Ludlam Island is a barrier island in southern New Jersey, on which Sea Isle City, and Strathmere, a part of Upper Township are located.

Geography
Ludlam Island is a barrier island along the Atlantic Ocean between Corson Inlet on the northeast, and Townsends Inlet on the southwest. Ludlam Bay, along with an expanse of salt marsh and tidal channels separates Ludlam Island from the mainland.

Ludlam Island was described in 1834 as,

An 1878 description of Ludlam Island is as follows, viz,

A footnote to the 1878 description further elaborates,

History
Joseph Ludlam purchased the island in the late 17th century, and grazed cows and sheep on it. In the 1880s, developer Charles K. Landis founded the City of Sea Isle on the island. The original vision that Landis had of Ludlam Island was modeled after Venice's opulent waterways and his plan for the island included canals and waterways.

Ludlam's Beach Lighthouse was constructed in 1885, and was built after Charles K. Landis requested a light because of several shipwrecks off the island. The light was an L-shaped, two-story, structure with a square light tower on top, located at 31st Street and the Boardwalk until 1924. In 1923, a fire was started when the keeper's dog knocked over a kerosene lantern, destroying the roof and the light.

References

Landforms of Cape May County, New Jersey
Barrier islands of New Jersey
Islands of New Jersey